Giovanni Camillo Canzachi was an Italian actor, mainly performing Commedia dell'Arte.

He was born in Bologna and mainly active in the first half of the 18th century. he was renowned as the character wearing the mask of the Dottore. He was recruited to perform in Vienna for the court of Emperor Charles the VI. Fluent in many languages, he invented the spirited and comic character of the Italianized Frenchman. In 1740, while in Venice, he published a comedy titled l' Adulatore (The Adulater). His play was not popular locally. Disenchanted, he then moved to Dresden, to perform for the elector's court.

Sources

Commedia dell'arte
18th-century Italian male actors
Italian male stage actors
18th-century Italian dramatists and playwrights
Year of birth missing
Year of death missing
Actors from Bologna